Pavana may refer to:

 Lycaena pavana, a small butterfly
 Nacaduba pavana, a species of lycaenid butterfly
 Pavana (music), a Renaissance dance
 Pavana (Hinduism), Hindu deity representing the wind
 Pavana, Italy

See also
 Pavan (disambiguation)
 Pavane (disambiguation)